Nora Leksir (married name is Génébrier) (born 13 May 1974 at Montbéliard) is a French athlete, who specializes in race walking.

Biography  
She won six French Walking Championships , three at 10 km and three at 20 km.  She also won three Indoor French walking titles  at 3,000 m.

She is the current record holder of France's 20 km walk doing 1:31.15, on 17 June 2000 at Eisenhüttenstadt.

She placed 22nd at the 2000 Sydney Olympics.

Prize list  
 French Championships in Athletics   :  
 winner of the 10 km walk in 1994,  1998 and 1999   
 winner of the 20 km walk in 1998,  1999 and 2000   
 French Indoor Athletics Championships:  
 winner of 3000 m walking 1998,  1999 and 2001

Records

Notes and references

External links  
 
 Olympic profile for Nora Leksir at sports-reference.com

1974 births
Living people
Sportspeople from Montbéliard
French female racewalkers
Olympic athletes of France
Athletes (track and field) at the 2000 Summer Olympics